Oussama Essabr (born 19 January 1989) is a Moroccan footballer who has played in Italy for Juventus F.C., Vicenza Calcio, A.C. Arezzo, Cosenza Calcio, F.C. Crotone, A.C. Prato, S.E.F. Torres 1903 and Vigor Lamezia

Career

Juventus
Essabr came through the Juventus youth system, and after a very successful time with the Primavera squad, he was loaned to Serie B side Vicenza. In June 2009, he returned to Juventus, but was loaned again in August 2009, this time to Lega Pro Prima Divisione side Arezzo. He went on to make 18 appearances and scored once during the 2009–10 Lega Pro campaign before returning to Juventus in June 2010. Essabr spent the next two seasons on loan, at Cosenza and Crotone respectively, appearing 23 times and scoring 5 goals.

References

External links
Oussama Essabr: storia e intervista, da GiovaniBianconeri.it (novembre 2017)

https://web.archive.org/web/20090226181125/http://www.vicenza.com/matrix/categorie/1049/2049001/3049001001/temi/giocatori/200809/essabr.shtml
http://www.gazzetta.it/speciali/2008/calcio/Players/player_p210986.shtml

1989 births
Living people
Moroccan footballers
Moroccan expatriate footballers
Serie B players
Juventus F.C. players
L.R. Vicenza players
S.S. Arezzo players
F.C. Crotone players
A.C. Prato players
Expatriate footballers in Italy
Cosenza Calcio players
Association football forwards